Borj Sukhteh may refer to:
 Borj Sukhteh-ye Olya
 Borj Sukhteh-ye Sofla